Mohd Shahrizan bin Ismail (born 3 November 1979) is a Malaysian footballer who plays as a goalkeeper.

Club career

Kelantan
Born in Kota Bharu, Kelantan, Shahrizan began his football career with Kelantan's youth team in 90's. Shahrizan was Kelantan's first-choice goalkeeper from 2008 to 2009. He also helped his team lift Piala Emas Raja-Raja in 2010.

In 2011, Shahrizan played 3 times in important matches with Johor FC (Round 2 of FA Cup, Kelantan won 1–0), Terengganu (6 June Kelantan's Super League won 3–0) and Perak (Super League on 14 June Kelantan won 1–0) and successfully completed the task without conceding any goals in three matches.

For 2017 season, Shahrizan made one appearance for Kelantan in a 5–0 defeat to Kedah on 26 July 2017.

Club statistics

Honours

Kelantan President Cup team
 Malaysia President Cup: 1995

Kelantan
 Malaysia Premier League: 2000
 Malaysia Super League: 2011, 2012 ;Runner-up 2010
 Malaysia FA Cup: 2012, 2013 ;Runner-up 2009, 2011, 2015
 Malaysia Cup: 2010, 2012 ;Runner-up 2009, 2013
 Malaysia Charity Shield: 2011 ;Runner-up 2012, 2013
 Unity Cup: Runner-up 2011

Selangor
 Malaysian Super League: 2002
 Malaysian Cup: 2002
 Malaysia FA Cup: 2001
 Malaysia Charity Shield: 2002 ;Runner-up 2003
 The Sultan of Selangor's Cup: 2001, 2003 ;Runner-up 2002, 2004

References

External links
 Shahrizan Ismail profile at Trwfc.com
 

1979 births
Living people
Malaysian people of Malay descent
Malaysian footballers
Malaysia international footballers
Kelantan FA players
Terengganu FC players
Selangor FA players
Kelantan TNB players
People from Kota Bharu
People from Kelantan
Association football goalkeepers
Malaysia Super League players
Kelantan United F.C. players